United States gubernatorial elections were held in 1894, in 28 states, concurrent with the House and Senate elections, on November 6, 1894 (except in Alabama, Arkansas, Georgia, Maine, Oregon, Rhode Island and Vermont, which held early elections).

In New York, the governor was elected to a two-year term for the first time, instead of a three-year term.

Results

See also 
1894 United States elections

References

Notes

Bibliography 
 
 
 
 
 

 
November 1894 events